Yucca aloifolia is the type species for the genus Yucca. Common names include aloe yucca, dagger plant, and  Spanish bayonet. It grows in sandy soils, especially on sand dunes along the coast.

Range
Yucca aloifolia is native to the Atlantic and Gulf Coasts of the United States from southern Virginia south to Florida and west to the Texas Gulf Coast, to Mexico along the Yucatán coast, and to Bermuda, and parts of the Caribbean. Normally Yucca aloifolia is grown in USDA zones 8 through 11. Yucca aloifolia is a popular landscape plant in beach areas along the lower East Coast from Virginia to Florida.

Yucca aloifolia has become naturalized in Bahamas, Argentina, Uruguay, Italy, Pakistan, South Africa, Queensland, New South Wales, and Mauritania. It is common in gardens and parks of the Iberian Peninsula (Portugal and Spain).

Description
When this occurs, the tip turns upward and keeps on growing. The young leaves near the growing tip stand erect; older ones are reflexed downward, and the oldest wither and turn brown, hanging around the lower trunk like a Hawaiian skirt. After flowering, the trunk stops growing, but one or more lateral buds are soon formed, and the uppermost becomes a new terminal shoot. Yucca aloifolia also produces new buds, or offshoots, near the base of the trunk, forming the typical thicket often observed in dry sandy and scrub beach areas of the southeastern United States.

Yucca aloifolia flowers are white and showy, sometimes tinged purplish, so that the plant is popular as an ornamental. Fruits are elongated, fleshy, up to 5 cm long. It is widely planted in hot climates and arid environments.

Uses
The fruit is eaten by both birds and humans, and the flowers can be eaten cooked or raw.

Yucca aloifolias roots can be used as soap and shampoo.

Gallery

References

External links
Plants for a Future
Floridata, Tallahassee Florida USA
University of Florida IFAS Extension
Lady Bird Johnson Wildflower Center, University of Texas
Dave's Garden
US Department of Agriculture Plants Profile
How to Kill a Yucca Aloifolia by Melissa Lewis, Demand Media, SFGate, San Francisco California USA
Plants of Upper Newport Bay (Newport Beach California USA), University of California at Irvine Natural History Society, Yucca aloifolia Liliaceae
Royal Horticultural Society, London UK
Wild Edible and Medicinal Plants, Keys to Liberty
Atlas of Florida Vascular Plants, Institute for Systematic Biology, University of South Florida
Horticulture Unlimited, Tucson Arizona USA, Spanish Bayonet
Agraria, Piate de Vaso, Yucca, Tronchetto della felicità 

aloifolia
Flora of the Caribbean
Flora of the Southeastern United States
Flora of Mexico
Plants described in 1753
Taxa named by Carl Linnaeus